Moscow-Petushki, also published as Moscow to the End of the Line, Moscow Stations, and Moscow Circles, is a pseudo-autobiographical postmodernist prose poem by Russian writer and satirist Venedikt Yerofeyev.

Written between 1969 and 1970 and passed around in samizdat, it was first published in 1973 in Israel and later, in 1977, in Paris.

It was  published in the Soviet Union only in 1989, during the perestroika era of Soviet history, in the literary almanac Vest'  and in the magazine Abstinence and Culture (Trezvost i Kultura) in a slightly abridged form.

The story follows an alcoholic intellectual, Venya (or Venichka), as he travels by a suburban train on a 125 km (78 mi) journey from Moscow along the Gorkovsky suburban railway line to visit his beautiful beloved and his child in Petushki, a town that is described by the narrator in almost utopian terms.

At the start of the story, he has just been fired from his job as foreman of a telephone cable-laying crew for drawing charts of the amount of alcohol he and his colleagues were consuming over time. These graphs showed a clear correlation with personal characters. For example, for a Komsomol member, the graph is like the Kremlin Wall, that of a "shagged-out old creep" is like "a breeze on the river Kama", and Venya's chart simply shows his inability to draw a straight line because of the amount he has drunk. Venichka spends the last of his money on liquor and food for the journey. While on the train, he engages in lengthy monologues about history, philosophy and politics. He also befriends many of his fellow travellers and discusses life in the Soviet Union with them over multiple bottles of alcohol. Eventually Venichka oversleeps, misses his station, and wakes up on the train headed back for Moscow. Still drunk, half-conscious and tormented by fantastic visions, he wanders aimlessly the night city streets, happens upon a gang of thugs, and is promptly chased and murdered by them.

Monument 

There is a monument for the novel in the Borby Square, Moscow, by the artists Valery Kuznetsov and Sergei Mantserev, consisting of two sculptures. One shows a man clinging to the train station sign Moscow and the sentence "You cannot trust an opinion of a person who hasn't yet got some hair of the dog" written on the pedestal. The other one shows a young woman under the train station sign Petushki and the sentence "In Petushki the jasmine never stops blooming and the birds always sing".

Stage version
In 1994, Moscow Stations was adapted as a one-man play (from a translation by Stephen Mulrine) and presented at the Garrick Theatre, London, starring Tom Courtenay in the role of Venya. The production won Critics Circle and Evening Standard awards, and transferred to New York in 1995 where it played at the Union Square Theatre, receiving excellent reviews.

References

Notes

External links
 e-book at Москва—Петушки (Russian website dedicated to the work of Venedikt Yerofeyev)

1970 Russian novels
Soviet novels
Russian humour
Novels set in Russia
Novels about alcoholism